Wind power in Illinois provided nearly 10% of the state's generated electrical power in 2020 powering 1,231,900 homes. At the end of 2020, Illinois had 6,300 megawatts (MW) of wind power installed, ranking fifth among states for installed wind turbine capacity. An additional 1,100 MW of wind power was under construction across the state at the end of 2020.

The vast majority of wind-generated electricity in Illinois is distributed via Midcontinent Independent System Operator, which services Illinois outside of northern Illinois--as opposed to PJM Interconnection, which distributes electricity in the Chicago metropolitan area.

Overview
Wind power has been supported by a renewable portfolio standard, passed in 2007, and strengthened in 2009, which requires 10% renewable energy from electric companies by 2010 and 25% by 2025. For 2013, in-state renewable generation was just 5.1% of Illinois' total generation. Additional renewably generated electricity is imported from other states.  Illinois uses a large amount of electricity, and the state's mandate was enacted when only a very small percentage of its electricity was renewably generated.

Illinois has the potential for installing up to an estimated 249,882 MW of wind generation capacity at a hub height of 80 meters operating at 30% gross capacity factor. That amount is lower with higher capacity factors and is higher with 100 meter hub heights.

The first wind farm in Illinois opened in 2003 and by 2009, it had over 1800 MW installed statewide with thousands of MW more in the planning stages. The largest wind farm in the state is the 300 MW Cayuga Ridge installation, while another seven windfarms each exceeded  MW capacity. The Twin Groves Wind Farm was the largest wind farm east of the Mississippi when completed but has since been surpassed. Some smaller installations include a 0.66 MW turbine at the Bureau Valley School District and a 2.5 MW turbine at the Illinois Sustainable Technology Center, formerly part of the Illinois Department of Natural Resources, now part of the University of Illinois. A proposed high voltage DC transmission line would transmit wind generated electrical power to the Chicago area from northwest Iowa. 

Power from some wind farms in Illinois is sold to the Tennessee Valley Authority.
A 2010 agreement with Iberdrola Renewables provides a potential 300MW future supply from the Streator Cayuga Ridge Wind Farm in Livingston County.

Wind farms

Wind generation

 Teal background indicates the largest wind generation month for the year.

 Green background indicates the largest wind generation month to date.

Source:

See also

Solar power in Illinois
Rock Island Clean Line
Wind power in the United States
Renewable energy in the United States

References

External links

Illinois Wind, a project of the Illinois Institute for Rural Affairs, Western Illinois University
Maps of operating and proposed wind power projects in Illinois 
 GA Mansoori, N Enayati, LB Agyarko (2016), Energy: Sources, Utilization, Legislation, Sustainability, Illinois as Model State, World Sci. Pub. Co.,